The Piracicaba River is a river of Minas Gerais state in southeastern Brazil. It is a tributary of the Doce River.

The Piracicaba River forms the northern boundary of the Rio Doce State Park until the point where it enters the Doce River from the left.

See also
 List of rivers of Minas Gerais

References

Rivers of Minas Gerais